Edward Watkins may refer to:

Ed Watkins, baseball player
Eddie Watkins, dual-code rugby player
Edward Watkins (rugby union), see List of Wales national rugby union players
Edward Watkins, captain, see Josias Fendall

See also
Edward Watkin (disambiguation)